Humko Deewana Kar Gaye (translation: You Made Me Crazy in Love) is a 2006 Indian Hindi romantic drama film directed by Raj Kanwar, produced by Raj Kanwar, Bhushan Kumar & Krishan Kumar and starring Anil Kapoor, Akshay Kumar, Katrina Kaif and Bipasha Basu in lead roles. Bhagyashree, Vivek Shauq, Shernaz Patel and Manoj Joshi also star in supporting roles. The film is produced by the Indian music company, T-Series and Inderjit Films Combine. The movie's score and soundtrack is composed by Anu Malik, while Himesh Reshammiya was invited as guest composer to compose only one song. with lyrics by Sameer. The film released on 14 April 2006. The music of the film released on 2 February 2006.

Plot 

Aditya, an automobile engineer, is passionate about cars. He is also a test driver for the company. Aditya is engaged to marry Sonia, a budding fashion designer. Aditya and Sonia are not on the same wavelength; while he is a traditionalist, she is an ultra-modern woman for whom career comes first. Much as Aditya tries to overlook these facts, they keep coming in the way of their relationship. Nevertheless, their wedding date is fixed and their families are preparing for the event.

Meanwhile, Aditya is sent by his employer to Canada to learn about a new car model to be launched in India. Sonia also leaves at the same time for Paris in connection with a fashion show. Aditya arrives in Canada and is received by his sister Simran, her husband Robby and their son, who all live in Canada. Aditya keeps bumping into Jia, daughter of business tycoon Yashwardhan Birla, and fiancée of businessman Karan Oberoi. She has come to Canada all by herself to shop for her wedding. Despite her family's wealth, Jia is a simple girl who seeks true love.  As a child, Jia was surrounded by comfort but didn't receive attention from her busy father. Now, Jia's fiancé doesn't have time for her either. She finds a friend in Aditya, and as the two spend time together, their friendship grows.

Aditya gets an opportunity from his company to participate in a car rally. He persuades Jia to participate with him and they win. On returning from the rally, their car gets stuck in the snow and they have to spend the night together. They share a romantic moment, forgetting that they are engaged to other people. Soon, they realize they are falling in love. When Jia tells Aditya that she believes her father is responsible for her mother's death, Aditya tells this to his best friend and roommate, Nawab. On a drunken night, Nawab tells his other friend, who is a reporter. The reporter then publishes this story in the newspaper. Jia is extremely hurt and returns to India with the intention to marry Karan. Aditya also returns to India to marry Sonia and does not attempt to meet Jia.

Sonia turns out to be the designer hired for the wedding of Jia and Karan. Sonia persuades a reluctant Aditya to accompany her to this client's wedding. Jia's friend and Karan's secretary, Jenny, bumps into Nawab, who reveals that it was his fault that Jia's secret suspicion was published in the papers. But it is too late — the wedding ceremony is over and Jia and Karan are married. Jia then goes to meet Aditya to apologize. They confess their love for each other but agree never to meet again. However, Karan catches them talking, and questions Jia. She claims that she truly loves Karan and that Aditya is just a good friend.

When Aditya leaves the wedding, he finds an upside-down car on the road, and it turns out that Jia has had an accident and is trapped under the car. As petrol leaks, Aditya goes into the car to help Jia. The car catches fire, just as Aditya manages to free her. He helps her out of the car, while the press and public gather around. He accompanies Jia to Karan, telling him that Jia only belongs to him. However, Karan has a change of heart and removes Jia's mangalsutra, telling her to marry Aditya. Aditya's engagement with Sonia is also broken, and he and Jia hug, finally united.

Cast
Anil Kapoor as Karan Oberoi
Akshay Kumar as Aditya Malhotra
Katrina Kaif as Jia A. Yashvardhan
Bipasha Basu as Sonia Berry
Vivek Shauq as Nawab Sharif
Shernaz Patel as Jennifer
Manoj Joshi as Rasikbhai Galgalia
Bhagyashree as Simran Kohli
Mahesh Thakur as Robby Kohli
Helen as Kitty Kohli
Ranjeet as Harpreet Malhotra
Neena Kulkarni as Amrit H. Malhotra
Delnaaz Paul as Tanya Berry
Gurpreet Ghuggi as Gurpreet Guggi
Upasana Singh as Paramjeet Ghuggi
Uttara Baokar as Nirmala Malhotra
Gurpreet Ghuggi as Gurpreet Ghuggi
 Ahmed Khan as A. J. Yashvardhan (Jia's father)
Puneet Issar as Yuvraj Berry
 Master Abhay Kanwar as Dumpty Kohli
Himesh Reshammiya as himself - special appearance

Box office and reception
The movie received mixed reviews from critics upon release and earned ₹28 crores worldwide.

Soundtrack 
The soundtrack of the movie was composed by Anu Malik, while Himesh Reshamiya was invited as guest composer for one song. The lyrics were authored by Sameer.

References

External links 

2006 films
2000s Hindi-language films
Films shot in Edmonton
Films scored by Himesh Reshammiya
Films scored by Anu Malik
T-Series (company) films
Films directed by Raj Kanwar
Indian romantic drama films
Films about infidelity
2006 romantic drama films